Robert Thomas Giggie (August 13, 1933 – December 9, 2018) was an American professional baseball player and Major League Baseball pitcher.

Bob attended Charlestown High School and was signed as an amateur by his hometown Boston Braves on July 5, 1951. 

Giggie's best season in the minors was with the Hagerstown Braves in the Class B Interstate League, when he had a record of 18 wins and 7 losses, with 2.82 earned run average in 214 innings pitched.  

He appeared in 16 games for the Milwaukee Braves during the 1959 and 1960 seasons.  He was traded to the Kansas City Athletics on May 11, 1960, for pitcher George Brunet, then pitched in 14 games for the Athletics in 1960 and 1962.

In the major leagues, Giggie compiled a 3–1 win–loss mark and an earned run average of 5.18. In 30 games and 57⅓ innings pitched, he allowed 70 hits and 32 bases on balls. He struck out 32 and registered one save and no complete games.  He retired after the 1962 season. 

He died at his home in Braintree, Massachusetts on December 9, 2018.

References

External links
 

1933 births
2018 deaths
Atlanta Crackers players
Baseball players from Boston
Dallas Rangers players
Hagerstown Braves players
Hawaii Islanders players
Kansas City Athletics players
Major League Baseball pitchers
Milwaukee Braves players
Paris Lakers players
Portland Beavers players
Rochester Red Wings players
Wichita Braves players